Mohamed Ahmed Mohamoud Awad is a Somali politician, who is currently serving as the Minister of Investment Promotion of Somaliland.

See also

 Ministry of Investment Promotion (Somaliland)
 Politics of Somaliland
 List of Somaliland politicians

References

People from Hargeisa
Peace, Unity, and Development Party politicians
Living people
Government ministers of Somaliland
Year of birth missing (living people)